Andrew McGrath (born June 2, 1998) is a professional Australian rules footballer playing for the Essendon Football Club in the Australian Football League (AFL). He was recruited by the Essendon Football Club with the first overall selection in the 2016 national draft.

Early life
McGrath was born in Mississauga, Ontario and moved to Melbourne, Australia at age 5. McGrath participated in the Auskick program at Whyte Street in Brighton, Victoria and played junior football with the East Brighton Football Club in the South Metro Junior Football League. He was a talented junior track and field athlete winning the Australian national under-14 high jump competition in 2011, the Victorian state heptathlon and national 200m hurdles events at under-15 level in 2012 and the under-17 400m hurdles in 2014. He was named All-Australian and co-captain of the 2016 AFL Under 18 Championships playing for Vic Metro, and was also the captain of Brighton Grammar School, where he was part of three consecutive APS Football premierships.

AFL career
McGrath was recruited by the Essendon Football Club with the number one draft pick in the 2016 national draft. He made his debut in the 25 point win against  in the opening round of the 2017 season at the Melbourne Cricket Ground, recording 22 disposals. He received an AFL Rising Star nomination for his performance in the sixty-five point loss against Adelaide at Adelaide Oval in round four, in which he garnered twenty-eight disposals and four tackles. He kicked his first AFL goal against Melbourne in round 6. McGrath had another notable performance against Adelaide in round 21, where he kept star forward Eddie Betts goalless and held him to only seven disposals, his lowest output of the season. He capped off an outstanding first season by winning the AFL Rising Star, receiving the Ron Evans Medal with 51 votes out of a possible 55, becoming the second Essendon player to win the award, after Dyson Heppell, as well as winning the AFLPA Best First Year Player award, and was named in the 22under22 team.

McGrath was named to the 22under22 team again in 2018 and 2019, and was captain of the 22under22 team in 2020. He moved into Essendon's midfield full-time in 2020, and received the club's Adam Ramanauskas Most Courageous Player award in that year.

On October 11, 2020 the Essendon Football Club announced that McGrath had re-signed until 2022.

For the 2021 season, the Essendon Football Club appointed McGrath a joint vice-captain alongside Michael Hurley and Zach Merrett. He opened the season with 33 disposals, 11 tackles, and a goal in a one-point loss to Hawthorn in Round 1. Early in the first term of the Bombers' round 12 match against Richmond on June 5, 2021, McGrath was substituted out with what proved to be a grade two posterior cruciate ligament injury, which was expected to put him out of action for eight to 12 weeks. He made his return in Essendon's Round 22 match against the Gold Coast Suns, in which he had 13 disposals, three marks, and three tackles.

McGrath played in his hundredth match on May 1, 2022. On July 15, 2022 the Essendon Football Club announced he had signed on to remain with the club through the 2024 season.

Statistics
Statistics are correct to the end of the 2022 season

|- style="background-color: #EAEAEA"
! scope="row" style="text-align:center" | 2017
|  || 1 || 21 || 1 || 1 || 181 || 234 || 415 || 83 || 59 || 0.0 || 0.0 || 8.6 || 11.1 || 19.8 || 4.0 || 2.8
|-
! scope="row" style="text-align:center" | 2018
|  || 1 || 20 || 5 || 1 || 203 || 195 || 398 || 77 || 48 || 0.2 || 0.1 || 10.2 || 9.8 || 19.9 || 3.9 || 2.4
|- style="background-color: #EAEAEA"
! scope="row" style="text-align:center" | 2019
|  || 1 || 23 || 9 || 3 || 230 || 224 || 454 || 75 || 59 || 0.4 || 0.1 || 10.4 || 10.2 || 20.6 || 3.4 || 2.7
|- style="background-color: #EAEAEA"
! scope="row" style="text-align:center" | 2020
|  || 1 || 14 || 0 || 1 || 149 || 161 || 310 || 22 || 67 || 0.0 || 0.1 || 10.6 || 11.5 || 22.1 || 1.6 || 4.8
|- style="background-color: #EAEAEA"
! scope="row" style="text-align:center" | 2021
|  || 1 || 15 || 2 || 4 || 171 || 168 || 339 || 43 || 66 || 0.1 || 0.3 || 11.4 || 11.2 || 22.6 || 2.9 || 4.4
|- style="background-color: #EAEAEA"
! scope="row" style="text-align:center" | 2022
|  || 1 || 18 || 2 || 5 || 214 || 171 || 385 || 90 || 47 || 0.1 || 0.3 || 11.9 || 9.5 || 21.4 || 5.0 || 2.6
|- class="sortbottom"
! colspan=3| Career
! 111
! 19
! 15
! 1166
! 1165
! 2331
! 394
! 347
! 0.2
! 0.1
! 10.5
! 10.5
! 21.0
! 3.5
! 3.1
|}

References

External links

1998 births
Living people
VFL/AFL players born outside Australia
Canadian expatriate sportspeople in Australia
Canadian players of Australian rules football
Essendon Football Club players
People educated at Brighton Grammar School
Sandringham Dragons players
Sportspeople from Mississauga
Australian rules footballers from Victoria (Australia)
AFL Rising Star winners